Sri Venkateswara Bhakthi Channel (SVBC TV)  is the pioneer devotional (bhakthi) channel of TTD. It is the first 24-hour satellite Telugu devotional channel dedicated to broadcasting Hindu devotional programs and live telecasts of poojas performed in the Tirumala Tirupati Devasthanams from Tirupati in Andhra Pradesh, India.

SVBC was launched by the then President of India Pratibha Patil on 7 July 2008. Its main content is Hindu devotional programs. It broadcasts daily rituals that are performed in Tirumala and Tirupathi. It also telecasts the annual festival called the Lord Sri Venkateshwara Brahmotsavam. TTD has decided to expand the channel to other south Indian languages. Earlier, the channel used to broadcast in the Kannada and Tamil languages.

The channel won 11 Nandi TV awards in 2009 for its devotional serials. It is available on all cable, dish and IPTV platforms in India as a free-to-air channel. It is also streamed live on the Internet.

Now SVBC 2 is its sister channel broadcasting content in Tamil and Kannada languages.

This channel was officially launched on 14 April 2017.

SVBC2 Tamil (Tamil:ஶ்ரீ வேங்கடேஸ்வரா பக்தி சேனல் )

SVBC 3 is a dedicated Kannada channel (kannada:ಶ್ರೀ ವೆಂಕಟೇಶ್ವರ ಭಕ್ತಿ ಚಾನೆಲ್) and SVBC 4  is a dedicated for Hindi language all channels are launched on 12 October on the festive day during Srivari Brahmotsavams 2021.

Presently this channel is available on Tata SKY, Videocon DTH, SUN Direct and many other Indian satellite TV providers.

Notes

External links 
The Hindu : Andhra Pradesh News : Bhakti channel to test launch today
The Hindu : Andhra Pradesh / Vijayawada News : SVBC to launch three more channels
All set for 1st anniversary fete of SV BC
SVBC channel serials win 11 Nandi awards
TTD SVBC Channel online

Religious television channels in India
Telugu-language television channels
Television channels and stations established in 2008
Tirumala Tirupati Devasthanams
Television stations in Andhra Pradesh